George G. Moseley was a state legislator in Mississippi. He served in the Mississippi House of Representatives from Hinds County, Mississippi in 1874 and 1875.

He was the principal of Christ's Missionary and Industrial College in Hinds County.

See also
African-American officeholders during and following the Reconstruction era

References

African-American state legislators in Mississippi
Members of the Mississippi House of Representatives
African-American politicians during the Reconstruction Era
People from Hinds County, Mississippi
American school principals
19th-century American politicians
Year of birth missing
Year of death missing